"Les Dalton" ("The Daltons") is a 1967 song by Joe Dassin. It was originally released as the first track of a 4-title EP on CBS.

The song is based on The Daltons, the characters from the comic strip series Lucky Luke. Dassin recorded it for CBS in London, accompanied by the Johnny Arthey band.

The song reached the top 10 in France.

Track listing 
7-inch EP (CBS EP 6356, 1975, 1967)
 Les Dalton (2:36)
 Hello Hello! (2:18)
 Viens voir le loup (2:52)
 C'est un cœur de papier (2:12)

References 

1967 songs
1967 singles
Joe Dassin songs
French songs
Songs about comics
Songs about fictional male characters
CBS Records singles
Songs written by Joe Dassin
Song recordings produced by Jacques Plait
Songs written by Jean-Michel Rivat
Songs written by Frank Thomas (lyricist)